RNAA may mean:

 RNA activation, a small RNA-guided gene regulation phenomenon
 Radiochemical Neutron Activation Analysis, a nuclear process used for determining the concentrations of elements